The George Town Literary Festival (GTLF) is an annual literary festival which takes place in the city of George Town, Penang, Malaysia. It is currently the largest world literature festival organised in Malaysia and the first literary event in Southeast Asia to receive the Literary Festival Award at the London Book Fair International Excellence Awards.

GTLF celebrates world literature, translations, and the literary arts, with various writers, artists and thinkers from diverse locations and disciplines coming together annually to engage in intellectual discourse. It is the only literary festival funded by the state government in Malaysia.

The festival generally takes place every last weekend of November. Admission to the festival is free to all members of the public.

History 

GTLF was initiated in 2011 by former Chief Minister of Penang, Lim Guan Eng. Debuting with a line-up of 5 writers, the festival's last edition featured over 80 writers and speakers while its upcoming edition will take place from 21–24 November 2019. Since 2016, the festival has been organised by the Penang Convention & Exhibition Bureau. Previously, Penang Global Tourism led production from 2011-2014 while Penang Institute took charge in 2015. 

The festival's first eight editions (with the exception of 2014) were curated by Bernice Chauly under the direction of the State Government of Penang. She was appointed festival director in 2015 and continued leading the curatorial team until 2018.

2011: History & Heritage: Where are our Stories? 

GTLF's inaugural edition was themed “History & Heritage: Where are our Stories?” and comprised 7 events held across 26 & 27 November 2011. Taking place in the then-newly established China House and the Eastern & Oriental Hotel, the festival's five headliners were Malaysian authors Muhammed Haji Salleh, Farish A. Noor, Iskandar Al-Bakri, Shih-Li Kow and Tan Twan Eng.

2012: Voyages. Hopes. Dreams. 

Themed "Voyages. Hopes. Dreams." the second edition of the festival was the first to feature an international lineup comprising writers from India, Indonesia, Malaysia, the Netherlands, Singapore and the United Kingdom. Held at Sekeping Victoria, China House and Studio @ Straits, the festival spanned 20 events while its duration was extended to 3 days. Its line-up of 26 writers and moderators included A. Samad Said, Alfian Sa'at, David van Reybrouck, Linda Christanty and Nii Ayikwei Parkes.

2013: The Ties That Bind 

Due to increased support from foreign embassies and government agencies, the 2013 festival programme grew to feature 37 events in Sekeping Victoria, China House and 179 Victoria Street. Themed "The Ties That Bind", 20 speakers headlined the festival including Ali Cobby Eckermann, Eric Hansen, Tash Aw, Christine Otten and Lat.

2014: Capital 
The 2014 edition was notable for being curated by the Cooler Lumpur Festival. It took place in Whiteaways Arcade and was themed "Capital". The festival shifted its focus to writers, with programmes aimed at developing local writing and the publishing industry. There was also a fringe programme comprising a stand-up comedy performance and a pub quiz. It spanned 38 events and featured 27 speakers including Eddin Khoo, Miguel Syjuco, John Krich, Sudhir Thomas Vadaketh and Susan Barker.

2015: We Are Who We Are/Are We Who We Are? 
In 2015, the festival was themed "We Are Who We Are/Are We Who We Are?" in conjunction with its focus on dissecting the human and Malaysian identity. and featured 36 speakers including Wajahat Ali, Evan Fallenberg, Robin Hemley, Pablo Jofré and Hanne Ørstavik. The keynote was delivered by Marina Mahathir.

2016: Hiraeth 

In recognition of the displacement of communities across the globe, the 2016 festival was themed "Hiraeth". The festival, which took place in Wisma Yeap Choy Ee, Black Kettle and China House, brought 40 writers together across 44 sessions. The festival keynote was delivered by Zainah Anwar, preceding a lecture on the theme by A. C. Grayling. Other headliners included Adriaan van Dis, Nathalie Handal, Mahesh Dattani, Olga Martynova and Stephen James Smith.

The festival's growing presence and increasing public attention led to pro-government supporters defacing an exhibition by Zunar, whose works commented politically on former Prime Minister Najib Razak's corruption allegations. Zunar's eventual arrest drew international attention from human rights watchdogs as well as support for the festival's position as a platform for free speech. The launch of his book, Wasabi, was cancelled as a result. The 2016 edition of the festival is also notable for scoring a nomination in the Literary Festival Award category at the LBF International Excellence Awards.

2017: Monsters & (Im)Mortals 

In 2017, the festival featured a theme of "Monsters & (Im)Mortals". Featuring a larger curatorial team due to the addition of Gareth Richards and Pauline Fan as co-curators, the festival line-up comprised 46 writers and 55 activities. Among the year's headliners were Gerður Kristný, Mei Fong, Latiff Mohidin, Laksmi Pamuntjak and Gündüz Vassaf. The 2017 edition became the first literary festival in Southeast Asia to receive the Literary Festival Award at the LBF International Excellence Awards in the following year.

2018: The State of Freedom 

The 2018 edition was themed "The State of Freedom" to commemorate the anniversaries of human rights milestones around the globe, the state of Penang's commitment to freedom of expression, and  Malaysia's first change in government since achieving independence 59 years prior.

Extended to run across 4 days, the 2018 edition featured the largest line-up of writers and number of events in the festival's history. 82 writers were present at the festival's 65 events, including Sjón, Lemn Sissay, Ivan Coyote, Arshia Sattar and Jean-Christophe Rufin. Notable events at the 2018 edition included a conversation with Anwar Ibrahim, a section on LGBTQIA+ discourses, as well as the inaugural Malaysia National Poetry Slam.

2019: forewords/afterwords 
The 2019 edition is themed "forewords/afterwords" in reference to W. H. Auden's final collection of essays. Taking place from 21–24 November 2019, the festival will be directed by Pauline Fan and Sharaad Kuttan, marking the first time two co-directors will helm the festival in its 9-year history. The line-up of the festival will include 2019 Man Booker International Prize winner Jokha al-Harthi, as well as 2019 EBRD Literature Prize winner Hamid Ismailov.

2020: Through The Looking Glass 
The tenth edition was themed Through The Looking Glass, which looks at the role of literature and art in a time of crisis. Due to the pandemic, this is the first edition of the festival to have been shifted entirely online. The festival programme presented mostly online, with a series of podcasts and videos both in English and Bahasa Malaysia; featuring conversations, discussions, readings and radio drama. All conversations were available on Spotify.  The online edition also featured young Malaysians who have had their works recognised internationally. They include Joshua Kam (winner Epigram Books Fiction Prize 2020), graphic novelist Erica Eng (Eisner award - Best Webcomic), and Kulleh Grasi (shortlisted for the National Translation Award in Poetry 2020 in the US).

2021: Mikro-cosmos 
GTLF’s theme for 2021, Mikro-cosmos, explored the spirit of cosmopolitanism and interconnectedness that endures through literature, language and ideas, even as the troubles of today atomize our existence and deepen social fragmentation. This was the second edition to be held digitally with a small amount events taking place physically during the weekend of the festival. Regional and international headliners include Indonesian novelist Eka Kurniawan, Japanese writer Minae Mizumura, German poet Jan Wagner, Canadian writer Souvankham Thammavongsa, New Zealand novelist Tina Makereti, and Kenyan-US writer Mukoma Wa Ngugi. The festival was directed by Pauline Fan.

Publication

Muara 
To celebrate the decade of GTLF that has passed, GTLF collaborated with Svara journal to produce a special publication called Muara. Taking its name from the Malay word for estuary, Muara is a passage of fluidity and connection, where the river meets the open sea. In the pages of Muara, writers engage in ideas and imaginings, interpreting the shifting shoreline of our realities. Featuring essays, lectures, short stories, poetry, book reviews, and translations, Muara gathers established and emerging writers from Malaysia, the region, and the world. The book was launched in conjunction with GTLF2021.

References 

George Town, Penang
Festivals in Malaysia
Literary festivals in Asia
Malaysian literature